This is a list of airports in Ontario. It includes all Nav Canada certified and registered water and land airports, aerodromes and heliports in the Canadian province of Ontario.



National Airports System in Ontario

The following Ontario airports are part of the Canadian National Airports System:

List of airports and heliports

The list is sorted by the name of the community served; click the sort buttons in the table header to switch listing order.

Defunct airports

See also

 List of airports in the Bala, Ontario area

 List of airports in the Bracebridge area
 List of airports in the Fergus area
 List of airports in the London, Ontario area
 List of airports in the Ottawa area
 List of airports in the Parry Sound area
 List of airports in the Port Carling area
 List of airports in the Sault Ste. Marie, Ontario area
 List of airports in the Thunder Bay area
 List of airports in the Greater Toronto Area

References 

 
Ontario
Airports